

Hermann Lukas Plocher (5 January 1901 – 8 December 1980) was a German general during World War II. He was a recipient of the   Knight's Cross of the Iron Cross with Oak Leaves of Nazi Germany.

Awards

 Iron Cross (1939)  2nd Class (17 May 1940) & 1st Class (5 June 1940)
 German Cross in Cross on 9 April 1942 as Oberst im Generalstab (in the General Staff) in the V. Flieger-Korps
 Knight's Cross of the Iron Cross with Oak Leaves
 Knight's Cross on 22 November 1943 as Generalmajor and commander of the 4. Flieger-Division
 867th Oak Leaves on 8 May 1945 as Generalleutnant and commander of the 6. Fallschirmjäger-Division

Notes

References

Citations

Bibliography

 
 
 
 

1901 births
1980 deaths
Military personnel from Stuttgart
Luftwaffe World War II generals
Recipients of the Gold German Cross
Recipients of the Knight's Cross of the Iron Cross with Oak Leaves
Condor Legion personnel
People from the Kingdom of Württemberg
Major generals of the German Air Force
Lieutenant generals of the Luftwaffe